Okulice may refer to the following places in Poland:
Okulice, Lower Silesian Voivodeship (south-west Poland)
Okulice, Lesser Poland Voivodeship (south Poland)